Kağan Moradaoğlu (born 10 January 2003) is a Turkish professional footballer who plays as a goalkeeper for Trabzonspor.

Career
Moradaoğlu signed his first professional contract with Trabzonspor on 4 February 2019. All 3 of Trabzonspor's goalkeepers tested positive for COVID-19 in February 2021, causing Moradaoğlu to be summoned to the main squad from the U19s. He made his professional debut for Trabzonspor in a 1-0 Süper Lig win over Başakşehir on 19 February 2021.

References

External links
 
 

2003 births
Living people
Sportspeople from Trabzon
Turkish footballers
Turkey youth international footballers
Trabzonspor footballers
Süper Lig players
Association football goalkeepers